Planamarengo is a genus of sub-Saharan African jumping spiders first described by G. N. Azarkina and C. R. Haddad in 2020. The type species, Planamarengo bimaculata, was originally described under the name "Copocrossa bimaculata", but was moved to a new genus in 2020 when two similar species were discovered in Kenya.  it contains only three species: P. bimaculata, P. gatamaiyu, and P. kenyaensis.

See also
 Copocrossa
 Afromarengo
 List of Salticidae genera

References

Further reading

Salticidae genera
Spiders of Africa